Robert Mackay or Mckay, with spelling variations of the given name as Bobby, Rob, or Bob,  may refer to:

 Robert Mackay (businessman) (1840–1916), Canadian businessman and politician from Quebec
 Robert Mackay (priest), Dean of Aberdeen and Orkney from 1922 to 1934
 Robert Hugh MacKay (1868–1941), Canadian businessman and politician from Nova Scotia
 Robert McKay (American football) (1887–1958), American football player and investment banker
 Bobby McKay (1900–1977), Scottish football player and manager
 Robert McKay (lawyer) (1919–1990), dean of New York University Law School
 Bob McKay (born 1947), American National Football League offensive lineman 
 Robert Sinclair MacKay (born 1956), British mathematician
 Rob McKay (scientist), New Zealand paleoceanographer